The Fivefold Kiss is an element of Wiccan ritual which involves blessing five sacred parts of the body. With each bestowed blessing the area of the body is sealed with a kiss. Wiccan tradition practises differ, but the Five-Fold Kiss is first and foremost a blessing bestowed upon the High Priestess by the High Priest or by the High Priestess upon the High Priest. The ritual symbolises the act of honoring the person as a vessel of the female or male version of Deity.

Each kiss given is accompanied by a blessing:                               

This is the form of the blessing used by most Gardnerian and Alexandrian covens. 

In other Wiccan Traditions, the blessing is as follows:

The Five-Fold Kiss can be performed during Wiccan rites and ceremonies, such as handfasting or the Drawing down the Moon Rite.

References

Kissing
Magic rituals
Wicca